The Cathedral of St Louis (katedrala „Sveti Ludvig“) is a Roman Catholic cathedral in the city of Plovdiv, Bulgaria. Co-cathedral of the Diocese of Sofia and Plovdiv together with the Cathedral of St Joseph in Sofia, it is one of the largest and most important Roman Catholic places of worship in the country. It was named after Louis IX of France, commonly known as "Saint Louis".

The cathedral was constructed in the 1850s, during the time of vicar Andrea Canova. The first organ in Bulgaria was installed in the cathedral in 1861, later replaced with a newer and larger one. A fire severely damaged the cathedral in 1931 and destroyed the wood-carved ceiling. The cathedral was reconstructed, with Krastyo Stamatov creating the frescoes and Kamen Petkov being the main architect. The cathedral was once again inaugurated on 8 May 1932. Architecturally, it features an eclectic combination of Neoclassicism and Neo-Baroque.

The belfry was built in 1898 and was equipped with five bells cast in the German city of Bochum, a gift from Pope Leo XIII. A new 12-stop pipe organ was installed in 1991.

Princess Marie Louise of Bourbon-Parma, first wife of Ferdinand I of Bulgaria, is buried inside the cathedral, at the far end, to the right of the altar. An inscription in Bulgarian and Latin on her life can be read on both sides of the tomb.

Notes

Roman Catholic churches completed in 1861
19th-century Roman Catholic church buildings in Bulgaria
Churches in Plovdiv
Baroque architecture in Bulgaria
Roman Catholic churches in Bulgaria
Burial sites of the House of Saxe-Coburg and Gotha (Bulgaria)
1861 establishments in the Ottoman Empire
Roman Catholic cathedrals in Bulgaria
Neoclassical church buildings in Bulgaria